The Takpa is a linguistic northern sub-group of the Monpa people, while the southern sub-group is identified as the Tshangla. Monpas of the Takpa group are found in Tawang and Dirang of Arunachal Pradesh, Cuona of Tibet as well as Trashigang in Bhutan.

References

External links
 Tshangla language
 Guwahati profile

Tribes of Arunachal Pradesh